Michael John Naymick (August 26, 1917 – October 12, 2005) was a Major League Baseball pitcher who played for four seasons. A ,  pitcher, he played for the Cleveland Indians from 1939 to 1940 and from 1934 to 1944, and the St. Louis Cardinals in 1944.

References

External links

1917 births
2005 deaths
Major League Baseball pitchers
Cleveland Indians players
St. Louis Cardinals players
Baseball players from Pennsylvania
Baltimore Orioles (IL) players
Cedar Rapids Raiders players
Indianapolis Indians players
Oswego Netherlands players
Rochester Red Wings players
Springfield Indians (baseball) players
Wilkes-Barre Barons (baseball) players